Pontia distorta, the small meadow white, is a butterfly in the  family Pieridae. It is found in Ethiopia, Somalia, northern Kenya and possibly north-eastern Tanzania. The habitat consists of sub-desert thorn-bush areas.

References

distorta
Butterflies of Africa
Butterflies described in 1886
Taxa named by Arthur Gardiner Butler